The Himalayan agama (Paralaudakia himalayana) is an agamid lizard found in Central Asia and South Asia.

Description
Head much depressed; snout slightly longer than diameter of orbit; nostril lateral, below the canthus rostralis, slightly tubular. Upper head-scales smooth; occipital not enlarged; small closely set spinose scales on the head near the ear, and on the neck; ear entirely exposed, larger than the eye-opening. Throat strongly plicate; no gular pouch. Body depressed, with a more or less distinct fold on each side of the back; scales on the neck and sides small, smooth or very feebly keeled, uniform, those on the vertebral region enlarged, equal, roundish-hexagonal, imbricate, smooth or very feebly keeled; ventral scales smooth, a little smaller than the enlarged dorsals. Limbs strong, with compressed digits; the scales on the upper surface large and strongly keeled; fourth finger slightly longer than third; fourth toe considerably longer than third, the extremity of the claw of the latter not reaching the base of the claw of the former; fifth toe extending beyond first. Tail rounded, much depressed at the base, covered with moderate-sized strongly keeled scales arranged in rings; its length equals 2.5 to 3 times the distance from gular fold to vent.     Males with a double or triple row of thickened pre-anal scales. Olive above, marbled with black, and generally with round light spots producing a network; sometimes the black spots forming a festooned band on each side of the vertebral line; the male's throat marbled with blackish.

Distribution
NE Afghanistan, N Pakistan, Kashmir, Nepal, China (Xinjiang),
SE Turkmenistan, eastward through W Tajikistan to W Kyrgyzstan and E Uzbekistan.

Type locality: Leh and Kargil, Ladakh-Region.

Notes

References
 Ananjeva N B; Peters G; Rzepakovsky V T (1981). New species of the mountain agamas from Tajikistan, Agama chernovi sp. nov. TRUDY ZOOLOGICHESKOGO INSTITUTA AKADEMII NAUK SSSR 101:23-27.
 Ananjeva, N.B. & Tuniev (1994). Some aspects of historical biogeography of Asian rock agamids Russ. J. Herpetol. 1 (1):43.
 Steindachner, F. (1867). In: Reise der Österreichischen Fregatte Novara um die Erde in den Jahren 1857, 1858,1859 unter den Befehlen des Commodore B. von Wüllerstorf-Urbair (Zoologie), Vol. 1, part 3 (Reptilien p. 1-98). K. Gerold's Sohn/Kaiserlich-Königl. Hof- und Staatsdruckerei, Wien [1869 on title page]

External links

 

Paralaudakia
Reptiles of Pakistan
Reptiles of Afghanistan
Reptiles of Central Asia
Reptiles of India
Reptiles described in 1867
Taxa named by Franz Steindachner